Chiron is a famous centaur from Greek mythology.

Chiron may also refer to:

Space and astronomy
 2060 Chiron, a centaur (small Solar System body) in the outer Solar System
 Chiron (hypothetical moon), a supposed moon of Saturn later found not to exist
 Chiron, a fictional planet in the computer game Sid Meier's Alpha Centauri
 Chiron, a fictional planet in the James P. Hogan novel Voyage from Yesteryear

Cars and racing
 Louis Chiron (1899–1979), Monegasque racing driver
 Bugatti Chiron, the 2016 successor to the Bugatti Veyron
 Bugatti 18/3 Chiron, a 1999 concept car
 Chiron World Sports Cars, a British manufacturer of sports racing cars

Other uses
 Chiron (missile), the South Korean KP-SAM Shin-Gung surface-to-air missile
 Chiron Corporation, a biotechnology firm, now part of Novartis
 Chiron (journal), a German academic journal for ancient history
 Chiron (Percy Jackson), mentor and activities director in the series Percy Jackson & the Olympians
 Chiron (Moonlight), lead character in 2016 film Moonlight played by Alex Hibbert ("Little"), Ashton Sanders (teen Chiron) and Trevante Rhodes ("Black")
 "Chiron" (song), by All That Remains
 Chiron, a programming language created by Robert W. Floyd
 Chiron, a son of Tamora, Queen of Goths, in Shakespeare's tragedy Titus Andronicus
 Roman Catholic Diocese of Chiron, suppressed Greek Roman Catholic diocese

See also 
 Chyron (disambiguation)
 Chiro (disambiguation)
 Cheiron Studios, a music studio in Sweden
 Khyron, a villain in the TV series Robotech